The Concert Hour ( L'Heure du concert) is a Canadian classical music television series which aired on CBC Television in English and Radio-Canada in French from 1954 to 1958.

Premise
This was initially a local series on Montreal's CBFT airing on alternate weeks with Teletheatre until it was given a dual-network run from May 1954.
 Episodes were then broadcast weekly on both the English and French CBC networks with announcements in both languages.

Guest musicians included Glenn Gould, Louis Quilico, Robert Savoie and Rosalyn Tureck.

Classical music selections were supplemented by ballet, contemporary music and opera performances.

The series included ballet performances with choreographers such as David Adams, Ludmilla Chiriaeff, Heino Heiden, Brian Macdonald.

Orchestras were led by conductors such as Jean Deslauriers, Roland Leduc, Boyd Neel and Wilfrid Pelletier.

Reception

This cultural series had limited appeal, especially in areas such as Winnipeg where CBC held a monopoly of television signals. Many viewers switched off their televisions during broadcasts of The Concert Hour.

Scheduling

This hour-long series was broadcast as follows:

References

External links
 
The Concert Hour – Canadian Communication Foundation

CBC Television original programming
1954 Canadian television series debuts
1958 Canadian television series endings
1950s Canadian music television series
Black-and-white Canadian television shows